Pedro Cárdenas y Arbieto (1640–1687) was a Roman Catholic prelate who served as Bishop of Santa Cruz de la Sierra (1680–1687).

Biography
Pedro Cárdenas y Arbieto was born in Lima, Peru. On May 13, 1680, he was selected by the King of Spain and confirmed by Pope Innocent XI as Bishop of Santa Cruz de la Sierra. On December 21, 1681, he was consecrated bishop by Melchor Liñán y Cisneros, Archbishop of Lima. He served as Bishop of Santa Cruz de la Sierra until his death in 1687.

References

External links and additional sources
 (for Chronology of Bishops) 
 (for Chronology of Bishops) 

1640 births
1687 deaths
Clergy from Lima
Bishops appointed by Pope Innocent XI
17th-century Roman Catholic bishops in Bolivia
Roman Catholic bishops of Santa Cruz de la Sierra